Bu Wancang (July 1, 1900 – December 30, 1973), also known by his English name Richard Poh, was a prolific Chinese film director and screenwriter active between the 1920s and the 1960s. He was born in Anhui.

Career
Originally a member of the Shanghai cinema scene, Bu worked for several studios before becoming a major director for the Mingxing Film Company. By 1931, Bu moved to Mingxing's rival, Lianhua, where he directed such films as Love and Duty (1931) and The Peach Girl (1931) (both with actress Ruan Lingyu).

As the war with Japan intensified Bu made several films with subtle patriotic themes, most notably 1939's Mulan Joins the Army. Once Japanese control over Shanghai was complete, however, Bu was eventually forced to make several propaganda films for the occupiers, notably Eternity in 1943. After the war, he was ostracized by his colleagues for these films, causing him to move to Hong Kong in 1948 where he continued to make films until his retirement.

Filmography

As cinematographer

As director

External links

Bu Wancang at Hong Kong Cinematic
Bu Wancang at the Chinese Movie Database

Film directors from Anhui
Screenwriters from Anhui
Hong Kong film directors
1900 births
1973 deaths
Chinese silent film directors
People from Chuzhou
20th-century screenwriters